Thyretes montana is a moth in the family Erebidae. It was described by Jean Baptiste Boisduval in 1847. It is found in South Africa.

References

Endemic moths of South Africa
Moths described in 1847
Syntomini